The 2017 World Club Series (also known as the 2017 Dacia World Club Series) was the third staging of the World Club Series and featured two Super League teams and two National Rugby League (NRL) teams. The series included the World Club Challenge, a one-off match between the champions of the Super League and NRL.

Background
In 2016 it was suggested that the 2017 Series could be expanded to 8 teams. Two games would be played in Australia and two would be played in the UK with the World Club Challenge alternating each year.

Plans to expand the series were quashed when the NRL Grand Final runners up Melbourne Storm announced they would not be participating due to it interfering with their pre-season. The Brisbane Broncos were the only side that finished in the top 8 from that season that accepted an invitation to play meaning the series would be reduced to only two teams. Challenge Cup winners Hull F.C. would consequently not be able to participate as no game could be arranged.

Series details

Series Score

Game 1: Warrington Vs Brisbane

Warrington are the first Super League team to beat a NRL team in 5 years, and 8 games.

World Club Challenge

This series was the first victory for Super League since the conception of the World Club Series, after the NRL won the last two series.

References

2017 in Australian rugby league
2017 in English rugby league
World Club Challenge
Cronulla-Sutherland Sharks matches
Brisbane Broncos matches
Warrington Wolves matches
Wigan Warriors matches